Triveni Express is an Express train belonging to Northern Railway zone that runs between  and  in India. It is currently being operated with 15075/15076 train numbers on four days in week basis.

The name Triveni signifies the Triveni Sangam or the meeting pointing of three rivers of the Ganges, the Yamuna and the Saraswati at Prayag in Allahabad which is a station on the train's route.

Service

The 24369/Triveni Express has an average speed of 36 km/hr and covers 741 km in 20h 50m. The 24370/Triveni Express has an average speed of 37 km/hr and covers 741 km in 19h 55m.

Route and halts 

The important halts of the train are:

Coach composition

The train has standard ICF rakes with max speed of 110 kmph. The train consists of 15 coaches:

 1 AC II Tier
 1 AC III Tier
 4 Sleeper Coaches
 7 General
 2 Seating cum Luggage Rake

Traction

Both trains are hauled by a Lucknow Loco Shed-based WDM-3A or WDP-4 diesel locomotive from Shaktinagar to Bareilly and vice versa.

Rake sharing

The train shares its rake with 14369/14370 Triveni Express

Direction reversal

The train reverses its direction 1 times:

See also 

 Shaktinagar Terminal railway station
 Bareilly Junction railway station
 Pilibhit Junction railway station

Notes

References

External links 

 24369/Triveni Express
 24370/Triveni Express

Trains from Bareilly
Express trains in India
Named passenger trains of India